BDV or BdV may refer to:
 Borna disease virus, a member of the species Mammalian 1 orthobornavirus
 Big Daddy V, the ring name of an American professional wrestler Viscera
 Bremian Democratic People's Party, one of the regionally organised liberal parties in the state of Bremen
 Bund der Vertriebenen or Federation of Expellees, a non-profit organization formed in West Germany
 Banco de Venezuela, an international universal bank based in Caracas
 ISO 639:bdv, the ISO 639 code for the Bodo Parja language
 Moba Airport, the IATA code for the Moba Airport